Commander is a military rank.

Commander may also refer to:

 Leader, a leader of people

Computers and games
 Commander (computing), a file manager primarily with a list/detail view
 BCT Commander, a 2002 computer wargame developed by ProSIM Company and published by Shrapnel Games
 Commander: Europe at War, a 2007 computer wargame by Slitherine Software
 Magic: The Gathering Commander, a gameplay format in Magic: the Gathering
Important units in Total Annihilation and Supreme Commander

Military

United States
 Commander (United States), a military rank that is also sometimes used as a military billet title
 Commander, Naval Forces Vietnam, a command of the United States Navy, active from 1 April 1966 to 29 March 1973
 Commander, Naval Surface Forces Pacific, a United States Navy admiral, who leads the Naval Surface Force, United States Pacific Fleet
 Commander, Navy Installations Command, an Echelon II shore command responsible for all shore installations under the control of the United States Navy
 Commander, Navy Region Mid-Atlantic, one of eleven current naval regions responsible to Commander, Navy Installations Command
 Commander, Strike Force Training Pacific, part of the U.S. Third Fleet
 Commander, U.S. Pacific Fleet, the title of the Navy officer who commands the United States Pacific Fleet

Other military
 Base commander, the officer assigned to command a military base
 Commander (Canada), an officer in the Royal Canadian Navy
 Commander (Merchant navy) or chief mate, head of the deck department of a merchant ship
 Commander (Royal Navy), a senior officer rank of the Royal Navy of the United Kingdom
 Commander Dante (born 1944), who became military leader of the New People's Army in the Philippines in October 1970 during the First Quarter Storm
 Commanding officer, the officer in command of a military unit
 Seti (commander), an ancient Egyptian soldier during the late 18th dynasty (14th century BCE)

Media 
 "Commander" (song), a 2010 song by Kelly Rowland
 Commander (film), a 1981 Hindi-language action drama film 
 The Commander (TV series), crime drama series by Lynda La Plante
 Commander (Star Trek), an officer in the TV series Star Trek

Natural sciences 
 Commander butterflies, the brush-footed butterfly genera Moduza
 Commander, common name for the brush-footed butterfly Moduza procris

Transportation
 Air Command Commander, an autogyro
 Chris-Craft Commander, a motorboat
 Studebaker Commander, an automobile
 Jeep Commander, an automobile nameplate used for several Jeep models
 Commander Air Charter (ICAO code CML), out of Canada
 Commander Mexicana (ICAO code CRM), out of Mexico

Other
 Commander, a large, heavy mallet used in timber framing, also called a beetle
 Commander (dog) (born 2021), dog of U.S. President Joe Biden
 Commander (knife), a recurve bladed folding knife made by Emerson Knives
 Commander (order), a title of honor prevalent in chivalric order and fraternal orders
 Commander Australia, an Australian telecommunications company
 Commander Islands, a group of treeless, sparsely populated Russian islands located east of the Kamchatka 
 Ricardo Fort (1968–2013), Argentine entrepreneur and socialite, nicknamed El Comandante (The Commander)
 San Antonio Commanders, Alliance of American Football team
 The Commanders, American TV series
 Washington Commanders, American football team in the National Football League (NFL)

See also

 Commander Cody (disambiguation)
 Commander Evans (disambiguation)
 Commander in Chief (disambiguation)
 
 
 Commendatore (disambiguation)